Ruchkino is a rural locality (a village) in Bryzgalovskoye Rural Settlement, Kameshkovsky District, Vladimir Oblast, Russia. The population was 19 as of 2010.

Geography 
Ruchkino is located on the Talsha River, 18 km north of Kameshkovo (the district's administrative centre) by road. Arefino is the nearest rural locality.

References 

Rural localities in Kameshkovsky District